Mario Pupella (10 April 1945 – 22 January 2023) was an Italian actor and stage director.

Biography
Born in Castelvetrano, Pupella made his professional debut on stage in a rendition of Luigi Pirandello's Henry IV. Mainly active on stage, he got his first film major role in 2002, in Roberta Torre's Angela. He was also a stage director, and served as artistic director of several theaters in Palermo, namely Teatro Europa, Teatro Crystal and Teatro Sant'Eugenio. He died on 22 January 2023, at the age of 77.

Selected filmography 
  Angela (2002)  
 I, the Other (2007)  
 I Viceré (2007)  
 The Sicilian Girl (2008)  
 La matassa (2009)  
 Salvo (2013) 
 At War with Love (2016)  
 Quel bravo ragazzo (2016)  
 Scappo a casa (2019)  
 Padrenostro (2020)

References

External links 
 

 

1945 births
2023 deaths
People from Castelvetrano
Italian male film actors
Italian male stage actors
Italian male television actors
20th-century Italian male actors 
Italian theatre directors